Tahoe Airport may refer to:

 Reno-Tahoe International Airport in Reno, Nevada, United States (FAA: RNO)
 Minden–Tahoe Airport in Minden, Nevada, United States (FAA: MEV)
 Truckee-Tahoe Airport in Truckee, California, United States (FAA: TRK)
 Lake Tahoe Airport in South Lake Tahoe, California, United States (FAA: TVL)